Hazro can mean:
Hazro, Diyarbakır Province, a district of Turkey
Hazro, Punjab, a town in the Punjab province of Pakistan
Hazro Tehsil, an administrative subdivision of Attock District, Pakistan